Nordiska Roddföreningen i Zürich, also known as Nordiska or NRF, is an amateur rowing club. Their club house is located on Mythenquai by lake Zürich, Switzerland. The members all have connection to the Nordic Countries (Denmark, Finland, Iceland, Norway, Sweden) for which the name of the club also symbolizes.

History 
On 22 February 1878, the club was founded by some students at ETH. They were all active rowers in other rowing clubs in Zürich.

References

External links
 Nordiska Roddföreningen i Zürich

Rowing clubs in Switzerland
Sports clubs established in 1878
1878 establishments in Switzerland